Zherebtsov (from жеребец meaning stallion) is a Russian masculine surname, its feminine counterpart is Zherebtsova. It may refer to

Oleg Zherebtsov (born 1968), Russian businessman
Olga Zherebtsova (1766–1849), Russian noble
Polina Zherebtsova (born 1985), Russian poet and author
Semyon Zherebtsov (born 1992), Russian ice hockey player

Russian-language surnames